George Reginald "Red" Horner (May 28, 1909 – April 27, 2005) was a Canadian ice hockey defenceman for the Toronto Maple Leafs of the National Hockey League from 1928 to 1940. He was the Leafs captain from 1938 until his retirement. He helped the Leafs win their third Stanley Cup in 1932. He was inducted into the Hockey Hall of Fame in 1965.

Born in Lynden, Ontario, Horner spent all of his time playing in Toronto, Ontario. As a junior player, he played for the Toronto Marlboros of the Ontario Hockey League. In his NHL career, he had the role of enforcer and retired with 42 goals, 110 assists and 1,264 penalty minutes in 490 regular season games. His election to the Hockey Hall of Fame has been considered rather controversial, as until his final two seasons was not considered the best defenseman on his own team, let alone in the NHL.  His contemporaries for most of his career were the Hall of Famers King Clancy and Hap Day, who were the best defensemen on his team.  It seems to rest more on his unprecedented and unequaled seven seasons as the NHL penalty minute leader. He retired as the league's all-time penalty minute leader, a mark he held until Ted Lindsay broke it in the late Fifties.

After retiring from hockey in 1940, Horner lived in Florida, and Toronto, where he became involved in business ventures for several companies including the Elias Rogers Fuels Limited and the Canada Coal Company Limited, where he later became President before retiring. 

On February 13, 1999, he was involved in the opening and closing ceremonies of the final game at Maple Leaf Gardens. He was also involved in the opening of the Air Canada Centre.

Horner was the last surviving member of Toronto's 1932 Stanley Cup team.

Horner was the oldest living NHL player at the time of his death in Toronto, Ontario and was later interred in Mount Hope Catholic Cemetery in Toronto.

Career statistics
Bold indicates led league

* Stanley Cup champion

See also
 List of NHL players who spent their entire career with one franchise

References

External links
 

1909 births
2005 deaths
Canadian ice hockey defencemen
Hockey Hall of Fame inductees
Ice hockey people from Ontario
Sportspeople from Hamilton, Ontario
Stanley Cup champions
Toronto Marlboros players
Toronto Maple Leafs players